Radetzky may refer to:

People
 House of Radetzky von Radetz, a Czech noble family originating in 14th century Kingdom of Bohemia
 Joseph Radetzky von Radetz (1766–1858), Czech nobleman and a general in the Habsburg military
Fyodor Radetzky (1820-1890), Russian general
 Sascha Radetsky, American Ballet Theatre soloist

Art
 Radetzky March, march by Johann Strauss I, dedicated to the Habsburg general
 Radetzky March (novel), named after the march

Other uses
 , battleship named after Joseph Radetzky
 Radetzky-class battleship, ship class named after the battleship
 Radetzky (steamship), named after Joseph Radetzky
 Radetski, a village in Sliven Province, Bulgaria, named after the steamship